Burra Bazar railway station is a Kolkata Suburban Railway station in Burrabazar, Kolkata. It serves the local areas of Burrabazar and M.G. Road in Kolkata, West Bengal, India. It is a very important station. The station has one platform only. Its station code is BZB.

Station

Complex 
The platform is not very well sheltered. The station lacks many facilities including water and sanitation.  There is no proper approach road to this station.

Layout

See also

References

External links
 

Sealdah railway division
Railway stations in Kolkata
Transport in Kolkata
Kolkata Suburban Railway stations
Kolkata Circular Railway